Amo Sharks ( Amō Nahangān) or Amo Region is one of eight regional first-class cricket teams in Afghanistan. The regional side represents the following provinces in the north of Afghanistan: Balkh, Faryab, Jowzjan, Samangan, and Sar-i-Pul. The team is named after the Amo, a river in northern Afghanistan and Central Asia.

Amo Region compete in the Ahmad Shah Abdali 4-day Tournament, which has had first-class status from 2017 onwards. In October 2017, they lost their opening fixture of the tournament, against Speen Ghar Region, by an innings and 46 runs.

They also play in the Ghazi Amanullah Khan Regional One Day Tournament, which was granted List A status from 2017., and the Afghan Shpageeza Cricket League Twenty20 competition (which has Twenty20 status from 2017) using the name Amo Sharks.

References 

Cricket in Afghanistan
Afghan first-class cricket teams